German submarine Wilhelm Bauer (originally designated U-2540) is a Type XXI U-boat of Nazi Germany's navy (Kriegsmarine), completed shortly before the end of World War II. It was scuttled at the end of the war, having never gone on patrol. In 1957, it was raised from the seabed off Flensburg Firth, refurbished, and recommissioned for use by the West-German Bundesmarine in 1960. Finally retired fully in 1983, it is the only floating example of a Type XXI U-boat. It has been modified to appear in wartime configuration and exhibited at the German Maritime Museum in Bremerhaven, Germany.

Design
Like all Type XXI U-boats, U-2540 had a displacement of  when at the surface and  while submerged. The submarine was powered by two MAN SE supercharged six-cylinder M6V40/46KBB diesel engines each providing , two Siemens-Schuckert GU365/30 double-acting electric motors each providing , and two Siemens-Schuckert silent running GV232/28 electric motors each providing .

U-2540 was fitted with six  torpedo tubes in the bow and four  C/30 anti-aircraft guns. She could carry twenty-three torpedoes or seventeen torpedoes and twelve mines. The complement was five officers and fifty-two men.

Construction and wartime service
Construction of U-2540 began on 28 October 1944 by Blohm & Voss in Hamburg-Finkenwerder. She was launched on 13 January 1945 and commissioned on 24 February 1945 as part of the 31st U-boat Flotilla for training purposes. In April 1945 the boat went to the front after training at Rønne on Bornholm. Due to the ongoing fuel shortages at the end of the war, the boat was relocated to Swinemünde before being scuttled near the Flensburg lightship on 4 May 1945.

Salvage, refit and new service
In June 1957, after more than 12 years on the floor of the Baltic Sea, U-2540 was raised and overhauled at Howaldtswerke, Kiel. The submarine was commissioned  as a research vessel in the Bundesmarine, serving from 1 September 1960 until 28 August 1968 as a test boat (class 241). On relaunch she was renamed Wilhelm Bauer, after the designer of the first German U-boat, Brandtaucher, built in Kiel by August Howaldt in 1850. From May 1970 she again entered service, this time with a civilian crew and served as a testbed for the technical innovations of the class 206 U-boat.

Conversion to museum ship
U-2540 was put on sale by the Ministry of Defence and acquired by the board of trustees of the German Maritime Museum Association and the German Maritime Museum in Bremerhaven. The boat was restored to its original World War II configuration after its transfer in August 1983 to the Seebeck yard, opening on 27 April 1984 as a museum ship in Bremerhaven, now sponsored by the Wilhelm Bauer Technology Museum association. It has imitation twin 30mm cannon and the bridge is not glazed as it was during service with the Bundesmarine.

In popular culture
Whilhem Bauer was featured in an episode of the documentary series Nazi Megastructures in 2016, with an episode entitled "Hitler's Killer Subs", which included the history of the design and construction of the Type XXI submarine.

Gallery

Other surviving U-boats
 SM U-1

References

Bibliography

External links

 
 A tour of the submarine (requires QuickTime VR software) 
 U-Boot Type XXI in detail, Essay with numerous photos of the Wilhelm Bauer attached.
 

Type XXI submarines
U-boats commissioned in 1945
U-boats scuttled in 1945
Museum ships in Germany
1945 ships
Bremerhaven
World War II submarines of Germany
Ships built in Hamburg
Maritime incidents in May 1945